The Chance of a Lifetime is a 1907 sports novel by the British-Australian writer Nathaniel Gould. Set in the world of English horse racing, it concerns the theft of a gold cup.

Film adaptation
In 1916, the novel served as a basis for the British silent film The Chance of a Lifetime directed by Bertram Phillips.

References

Bibliography
 Goble, Alan. The Complete Index to Literary Sources in Film. Walter de Gruyter, 1999.

External links
The Chance of a Lifetime at the Internet Archive

1907 British novels
Australian sports novels
British sports novels
Horse racing novels
Novels set in England
Novels by Nathaniel Gould
British novels adapted into films